Count of Gálvez is a hereditary title in the peerage of Spain, granted in 1783 by King Charles III to Bernardo de Gálvez, 1st Viscount of Gálvez-Town, hero of the American Revolutionary War and later viceroy of New Spain, an office he succeeded his father in.

Lady Dorothy Elizabeth Mary Walpole, eldest daughter of the 4th Earl of Orford, himself a descendant of British Prime Minister Robert Walpole, was married to the 5th Count of Gálvez.

Counts of Gálvez (1783)

 Bernardo de Gálvez y Madrid, 1st Count of Gálvez (1746-1786)
 Miguel de Gálvez y Saint Maxent, 2nd Count of Gálvez (1782-1825), eldest son of the 1st Count
 Matilde Gálvez y Saint Maxent, 3rd Countess of Gálvez (1778-1839), eldest daughter of the 1st Count
 Paulina Capete y Gálvez, 4th Countess of Gálvez (d. 1877), eldest daughter of the 3rd Countess
 Ernesto del Balzo y Capece, 5th Count of Gálvez (1845-1930), eldest son of the 4th Countess
 Adelaida del Balzo y Capece, 6th Countess of Gálvez (1843-1932), eldest daughter of the 4th Countess
 Luis Alarcón de la Lastra, 7th Count of Gálvez (1891-1971), direct descendant of the 1st Count
 Joaquín Alarcón de la Lastra y Domínguez, 8th Count of Gálvez (1926-1990), eldest son of the 7th Count
 Pedro María Alarcón de la Lastra y Romero, 9th Count of Gálvez, eldest son of the 8th Count

See also
Galveztown, Louisiana
Galveston, Texas

References

Bibliography
 

Counts of Spain
Lists of Spanish nobility